Washington Township is one of thirteen townships in Noble County, Indiana. As of the 2010 census, its population was 1,200 and it contained 627 housing units.

Geography

Unincorporated towns
 Ormas at 
 Washington Center at 
 Wilmot at 
(This list is based on USGS data and may include former settlements.)

References

External links
 Indiana Township Association
 United Township Association of Indiana

Townships in Noble County, Indiana
Townships in Indiana